Legislative elections for the Territorial Council were held in Saint Pierre and Miquelon on 18 March 2012.

Results

References

2012 in Saint Pierre and Miquelon
Saint Pierre
Elections in Saint Pierre and Miquelon